Pioneer DJ is a brand that represents the company's range of DJ products. In March 2015 KKR acquired an 86% percent stake from Pioneer Corporation. Again, in March 2020 KKR and Pioneer Corporation sold their respective stakes to Noritsu. DJ product range comprises DJ mixers, decks, headphones, effects units, all-in-one consoles, DJ software controllers, monitor speakers and various accessories.
The current professional grade CDJ-3000 decks and DJM-900 Nexus 2 mixer can be seen in DJ booths all over the world.

CDJ-Players (incomplete)

DJ-Controller (incomplete)

DDJ-Series

XDJ-Series

Mixers

Headphones 
 HDJ-1000
 HDJ-X10 C
 HDJ-X10
 HDJ-X7
 HDJ-X5
 HDJ-X5BT
 HDJ-S7

References

External links 
Pioneer DJ
Pioneer Corporation (Japan)

DJ equipment
Kohlberg Kravis Roberts companies
Pioneer Corporation
Consumer electronics brands
2014 establishments in Japan
Companies established in 2014
2014 mergers and acquisitions
2020 mergers and acquisitions